CAPS United F.C. is a Zimbabwean football club based in Harare. Formed in 1973, the team rose to prominence in the late 1970s and early 1980s. It was formerly nicknamed the Manchester Road Boys because of their former address. The team's current nicknames are "Makepekepe" and "Green Machine". Caps United was also known as the "Cup Kings" as they were known to perform well and win cup competitions.

History
The team is popularly known as the "Cup Kings" or "Makepekepe" due to their dominance in most cup tournaments. They are Harare's second most popular team after their rivals Dynamos F.C., whose fans refer to them as "Madzvinyu" (Lizards). While CAPS United have fewer trophies than Dynamos, they have produced some of the country's best players, including legends Shacky Tauro and Brenna Msiska, along with other great players.

In 1972, Maurice Kraemer decided to start an official football outfit to entertain workers at Central African Pharmaceuticals, a business based at Manchester Road. Just one year later CAPS Rovers was registered as a team in the Northern Region.

Coach, Steven Kwashi led the team to victory in the 1996 championship. In 2004, Charles Mhlauri took over the club, winning back-to-back championships with the club only losing one game in 2004; a 4–3 home defeat to Highlanders F.C. in a thrilling game at the National Sports Stadium.

On 30 August 2010, Lloyd Chitembwe's 20-month stint as CAPS United's head coach ended when his contract was terminated by mutual consent, following a poor run of results that had sparked a rebellion among the club's fans. On 12 January 2012, Sean Connor was appointed manager.

Due to the large fan bases and the passionate rivalry between CAPS United and the Dynamos, their games are referred to as the "Harare Derby", and they attract huge crowds. As for other rivalries, the matches between CAPS United and Bulawayo side Highlanders FC have been dubbed the "Battle of the Cities". In the past, these matches have been associated with violence with the match at Barbourfields Stadium in 2004 being abandoned due to crowd trouble in the 88th minute after CAPS United came from 3–1 down to level the match at 3–3.

Crest

Management
Manager:  Shakespeare Chinogwenya
Assistant Manager: Nelson Matongorere
Assistant Manager: Fungai "Tostao" Kwashi
Assistant Manager: Tonderai Marume

Honours
BP Cup:4
1996;1997;1998/99:2002

Zimbabwe Premier Soccer League: 5
1979, 1996, 2004, 2005, 2016

Castle cup, ZIFA cup, CBZ: 9
1980, 1981, 1982, 1983,1989, 1992, 1997,2004, 2008

Zimbabwean Independence Trophy: 4
1992, 1993, 1996, 1997

Zimbabwean Charity Shield: 2
1996; 2017

Zambezi Challenge Cup - Malawi: 1
2014

Performance in CAF competitions
CAF Champions League: 4 appearances
1997 – Third Round
2005 – Second Round
2006 – disqualified in Second Round 
2017 – Group Stage (Top 16)

CAF Confederation Cup: 2 appearances
2009 – First Round
2010 – Second Round of 16

CAF Cup: 3 appearances
1993 – withdrew in First Round
1994 – disqualified in First Round
1998 – withdrew in First Round

CAF Cup Winners' Cup: 4 appearances
1981 – Second Round
1982 – Quarter-finals
1983 – Quarter-finals
1988 – First Round

Current squad

Historical list of coaches

 Sarupinda [wasu]
 Ashton Nyazika
 Lovemore Nyabeza
 Freddie Mukwesha
 Nti Bihene Bonzu
 Shaky Tauro 
 Kabole
 Mafemba
 Friday Phiri
 Steve Kwashi
 Brenna Msiska
 Luke Masomere
 Justin Mathuthu
 Rahman Gumbo (2002–03)
 Fewdays Musonda (2003)
 Charles Mhlauri (2004–05)
 Lloyd Chitembwe (2008–10)
 Moses Chunga (2010–11)
 Sean Connor (2012)
 Mkhuphali "Mike" Masuku (2012)
 Taurai Mangwiro (2013–14)
 Mark Harrison (2015)
 Lloyd Chitembwe (2015–19)
 Darlington Dobo (2019–22)
 Lloyd Chitembwe (2022-)

References

External links
Caps United News Website : www.capsutd.com
Facebook Website

 
Association football clubs established in 1973
Football clubs in Zimbabwe
Sport in Harare
1973 establishments in Rhodesia